Charles Grenfill Washburn (January 28, 1857 – May 25, 1928) was a member of the United States House of Representatives from Massachusetts.

Biography
He was born in Worcester on January 28, 1857. Washburn graduated from Worcester Polytechnic Institute in 1875 and from Harvard University in 1880. He studied law, and was admitted to the Suffolk bar in 1887.  He connected with various manufacturing enterprises in the city of his birth.  

Washburn was elected a member of the Massachusetts House of Representatives and served in the Massachusetts Senate. He was a member of the committee to revise the State corporation laws in 1902.  He was a delegate to the Republican National Conventions in 1904 and 1916,and was elected as a Republican to the Fifty-ninth Congress to fill the vacancy caused by the death of Rockwood Hoar.  He was reelected to the Sixtieth and Sixty-first Congresses and served from December 18, 1906, to March 3, 1911.

He was an unsuccessful candidate for reelection to the Sixty-second Congress. After completing his term, he served as director of the Federal Reserve Bank of Boston. He became president of the Washburn Co. of Worcester, and served in that capacity until his death in Lenox on May 25, 1928.  His interment was in Rural Cemetery in Worcester.

References

Bibliography
Haynes, George Henry.: The Life of Charles G. Washburn. Boston and New York: Houghton Mifflin Company, 1931.
Who's who in State Politics, 1908 Practical Politics  (1908) p. 22.

External links

Charles G. Washburn at the Library of Congress

Republican Party Massachusetts state senators
Republican Party members of the Massachusetts House of Representatives
Politicians from Worcester, Massachusetts
Worcester Polytechnic Institute alumni
Harvard University alumni
1857 births
1928 deaths
Republican Party members of the United States House of Representatives from Massachusetts
Burials at Rural Cemetery (Worcester, Massachusetts)